Pedro Zingone (born 1899) was a Uruguayan footballer.

He was member of Uruguay squad which won gold medal at 1924 Olympics, but he did not play in any matches. He was also part of national team which won South American Championship in 1923 and 1924. He played club football for Lito.

Honours

Country 

 Uruguay
 South American Championship Winner: 1923, 1924
 Olympic Games Gold medallist: 1924

References

1899 births
Date of death unknown
Uruguayan footballers
Uruguayan people of Italian descent
Olympic footballers of Uruguay
Uruguay international footballers
Footballers at the 1924 Summer Olympics
Medalists at the 1924 Summer Olympics
Olympic gold medalists for Uruguay
Olympic medalists in football
Copa América-winning players
Association football midfielders